German submarine U-75 was a Type VIIB U-boat of Nazi Germany's Kriegsmarine during World War II. U-75 was moderately successful in her early career in the Battle of the Atlantic, but in autumn 1941 she was dispatched to the Mediterranean Sea with poor results, leading to the eventual destruction of the boat and her crew.

Design
German Type VIIB submarines were preceded by the shorter Type VIIA submarines. U-75 had a displacement of  when at the surface and  while submerged. She had two shafts and two  propellers.

U-75 was fitted with five  torpedo tubes (four fitted at the bow and one at the stern), fourteen torpedoes, one  SK C/35 naval gun, 220 rounds, and one  anti-aircraft gun The boat had a complement of between forty-four and sixty.

Service history
She was laid down on 15 December 1939 at the Bremer Vulkan-Vegesacker Werft (yard), in Bremen as yard number 3, launched on 18 October 1940 and commissioned on 19 December under the command of Kapitänleutnant (Kptlt.) Helmuth Ringelmann.

U-75 carried out training with the 7th U-boat Flotilla on 19 December 1940 until 31 March 1941. She then became operational with the same organization until October. After that, she was reassigned to the 23rd flotilla.

First patrol
Ringelmann was a good sea officer, who made an impact within three weeks of the boat's initial patrol starting, when on 29 April the submarine torpedoed and sank the 10,146 GRT liner  in the Central North Atlantic Ocean, killing fifteen sailors and one passenger.

Second and third patrols
As the Germans watched her demise, the U-boat was illuminated by a searchlight which was hurriedly extinguished by fire from the boat's AA gun.

On her third patrol U-75 sank two British cargo ships, the Harlingen and the Cape Rodney, both west of Ireland on 5 August 1941. The latter ship was taken in tow after being hit, but foundered west of Ushant on the ninth. These operations were conducted from the new submarine base at Saint-Nazaire in France, which provided type VII boats like U-75 with a greater patrol range and cruising ability, thus conferring an essential advantage.

Fourth patrol
The boat's fourth patrol was more unusual, requiring her to slip unnoticed through the heavily defended Strait of Gibraltar and into the Mediterranean to attack allied shipping operating from Gibraltar, Malta and Egypt. For these operations, U-75s home base was now Salamis in Greece, where she arrived on 2 November. On the journey there, the boat had taken a successful detour along the Libyan coast to see if she could catch any British resupply convoys. On 12 October she had seen just such a convoy and managed to sink two landing craft with gunfire before she escaped.

Fifth patrol and loss
Her final patrol was from 22 December 1941, and consisted of a similar sweep along the Libyan coast. On 28 December, six days since leaving Salamis, a small coastal convoy was spotted off Mersa Matruh, U-75 launched an attack which sank the small British freighter . The convoy's escorts had spotted the U-boat, however, and  ran the submarine down and dropped depth charges on the boat. The explosions forced U-75 to the surface, where 30 of her crew were rescued and taken prisoner by her erstwhile opponent before the boat heeled over and sank, taking 15 men with her, including her only captain.

Wolfpacks
U-75 took part in two wolfpacks, namely:
 West (2 – 20 June 1941)
 Goeben (27 September – 5 October 1941)

Summary of raiding history

See also
 Mediterranean U-boat Campaign (World War II)

References

Notes

Citations

Bibliography

External links

German Type VIIB submarines
U-boats commissioned in 1940
U-boats sunk in 1941
U-boats sunk by British warships
World War II submarines of Germany
1940 ships
World War II shipwrecks in the Mediterranean Sea
Ships built in Bremen (state)
U-boats sunk by depth charges
Maritime incidents in December 1941